In physics, the Bethe ansatz is an ansatz method for finding the exact wavefunctions of certain one-dimensional quantum many-body models. It was invented by Hans Bethe in 1931 to find the exact eigenvalues and eigenvectors of the one-dimensional antiferromagnetic Heisenberg model Hamiltonian. Since then the method has been extended to other models in one dimension: the (anisotropic) Heisenberg chain (XXZ model), the Lieb-Liniger interacting Bose gas, the Hubbard model, the Kondo model, the Anderson impurity model, the Richardson model etc.

Discussion
In the framework of many-body quantum mechanics, models solvable by the Bethe ansatz can be contrasted with free fermion models. One can say that the dynamics of a free model is one-body reducible: the many-body wave function for fermions (bosons) is the anti-symmetrized (symmetrized) product of one-body wave functions. Models solvable by the Bethe ansatz are not free: the two-body sector has a non-trivial scattering matrix, which in general depends on the momenta.

On the other hand, the dynamics of the models solvable by the Bethe ansatz is two-body reducible: the many-body scattering matrix is a product of two-body scattering matrices. Many-body collisions happen as a sequence of two-body collisions and the many-body wave function can be represented in a form which contains only elements from two-body wave functions. The many-body scattering matrix is equal to the product of pairwise scattering matrices.

The generic form of the Bethe ansatz for a many-body wavefunction is

 

This form is universal (at least for non-nested systems), with the momentum and scattering functions being model-dependent.

The Yang–Baxter equation guarantees consistency of the construction. The Pauli exclusion principle is valid for models solvable by the Bethe ansatz, even for models of interacting bosons.

The ground state is a Fermi sphere. Periodic boundary conditions lead to the Bethe ansatz equations. In logarithmic form the Bethe ansatz equations can be generated by the Yang action. The square of the norm of Bethe wave function is equal to the determinant of the matrix of second derivatives of the Yang action. The recently developed algebraic Bethe ansatz led to essential progress, stating that

The exact solutions of the so-called s-d model (by P.B. Wiegmann in 1980 and independently by N. Andrei, also in 1980) and the Anderson model (by P.B. Wiegmann in 1981, and by N. Kawakami and A. Okiji in 1981) are also both based on the Bethe ansatz. There exist multi-channel generalizations of these two models also amenable to exact solutions (by N. Andrei and C. Destri and by C.J. Bolech and N. Andrei). Recently several models solvable by Bethe ansatz were realized experimentally in solid states and optical lattices. An important role in the theoretical description of these experiments was played by Jean-Sébastien Caux and Alexei Tsvelik.

Example: the Heisenberg antiferromagnetic chain 
The Heisenberg antiferromagnetic chain is defined by the Hamiltonian (assuming periodic boundary conditions)

This model is solvable using the Bethe ansatz. The (here, periodic) boundary conditions impose the Bethe equations

or more conveniently in logarithmic form

where the quantum numbers  are distinct half-odd integers for  even, integers for  odd (with  defined mod).

Chronology

 1928: Werner Heisenberg publishes his model.
 1930: Felix Bloch proposes an oversimplified ansatz which miscounts the number of solutions to the Schrödinger equation for the Heisenberg chain.
 1931: Hans Bethe proposes the correct ansatz and carefully shows that it yields the correct number of eigenfunctions.
 1938:  obtains the exact ground-state energy of the Heisenberg model.
 1958: Raymond Lee Orbach uses the Bethe ansatz to solve the Heisenberg model with anisotropic interactions.
 1962: J. des Cloizeaux and J. J. Pearson obtain the correct spectrum of the Heisenberg antiferromagnet (spinon dispersion relation), showing that it differs from Anderson’s spin-wave theory predictions (the constant prefactor is different).
 1963: Elliott H. Lieb and Werner Liniger provide the exact solution of the 1d δ-function interacting Bose gas (now known as the Lieb-Liniger model). Lieb studies the spectrum and defines two basic types of excitations.
 1964: Robert B. Griffiths obtains the magnetization curve of the Heisenberg model at zero temperature.
 1966: C.N. Yang and C.P. Yang rigorously prove that the ground-state of the Heisenberg chain is given by the Bethe ansatz. They study properties and applications in and.
 1967: C.N. Yang generalizes Lieb and Liniger's solution of the δ-function interacting Bose gas to arbitrary permutation symmetry of the wavefunction, giving birth to the nested Bethe ansatz.
 1968: Elliott H. Lieb and F. Y. Wu solve the 1d Hubbard model.
 1969: C.N. Yang and C.P. Yang obtain the thermodynamics of the Lieb-Liniger model, providing the basis of the thermodynamic Bethe ansatz (TBA).

References

External links
Introduction to the Bethe Ansatz

Magnetism
Condensed matter physics
Exactly solvable models